The following is a list of St. Patrick's Day-related television episodes and specials.

Animated shows 
 Bob’s Burgers: "Flat-Top o' the Morning to Ya" (2020)
 Baby Blues: "St. Patrick Day" (2003)
 The Care Bears: "Grumpy's Three Wishes" (1986)
 Chicago Party Aunt: "St. Patrick's Day" (2022)
 Chip 'n Dale: Rescue Rangers: "The Last Leprechaun" (1989)
 Doc McStuffins: St. Patrick's Day Dilemma (2016)
 DuckTales "Luck O' the Ducks" (1987)
 Extreme Ghostbusters: "The Luck of the Irish" (1997)
 The Fairly OddParents: "Crocker of Gold" (2010)
 Futurama: "The Luck of the Fryrish" (2001)
 Handy Manny: "St. Patrick's Day" (2012)
 The Huckleberry Hound Show: "Huck of the Irish" (1961)
 Inspector Gadget: "Luck of the Irish" (1983)
 Jackie Chan Adventures: "Tough Luck" (2002)
 The Leprechauns' Christmas Gold: a Rankin-Bass St. Patrick's Day/Christmas special (1981)
 Lil' Bush: "St. Patrick's Day" (2008)
 Lippy the Lion & Hardy Har Har: "Shamrocked" (1963)
 Looney Tunes Cartoons: "Lepreconned" (2021)
 The Loud House: "No Such Luck" (2017)
 Martin Mystery: Rage of the Leprechaun (2006)
 Mickey Mouse Clubhouse: Minnie's Rainbow (2009)
 Mickey Mouse Mixed-Up Adventures: "Petey O'Pete" (2020)
 New Looney Tunes: "Erin Go Bugs" (2018)
 The Oblongs: "St. Patrick Day" (2003)
 Puppy Dog Pals:
"Somewhere Under the Rainbow" (2020)
"Pups of the Dance" (2021)
"Find That Fiddle" (2022)
 The Ren & Stimpy Show "A Hard Day's Luck" (1994)
 The Real Ghostbusters: "The Scaring of the Green" (1987)
 Rugrats/All Grown Up!:
"Lady Luck" (1998)
"Tweenage Tycoons" (2003)
"Lucky 13" (2004)
 The Simpsons: 
 "Homer vs. the Eighteenth Amendment" (1997)
 "Sex, Pies and Idiot Scrapes" (2008)
 South Park:  Credigree Weed St. Patrick's Day Special (TV Episode 2022)
 The Super Mario Bros. Super Show!: "Mighty McMario and the Pot of Gold" (1989)
 Teen Titans Go!:
 "Beast Boy's Bad Luck, and It's Bad" (2016)
 "The Gold Standard" (2017)
 Teletubbies: "Irish Dancing" (1998)
 Uncle Grandpa: "The Lepre-Con" (2016)

Dramas 

 Beverly Hills, 90210: "The Leprechaun" (1999)
 Boardwalk Empire: "Nights in Ballygran" (2010)
 Bonanza: "Hoss and the Leprechauns" (1963)
 Charmed: "Lucky Charmed" (2003)
 CSI: NY: "Pot of Gold" (2010)
 Early Edition: "Luck O' The Irish" (2000)
 Law & Order: Criminal Intent: "Silencer" (2007)
 Lie to Me: "Sweet Sixteen" (2010)
 Love/Hate: Season 3, Episode 1 (2012)

Sitcoms 
 2 Broke Girls: "And the Kilt Trip" (2014)
 30 Rock: 
 "The Funcooker" (2009)
 "St. Patrick's Day" (2012)
 According to Jim: "The Thin Green Line" (2006)
 The Afterparty: "High School" (2022)
 ALF: "Superstition" (1989)
 All in the Family: "Too Good Edith" (1979)
 Batman: "The Joker's Flying Saucer" (1966) 
 Bewitched: 
 "The Leprechaun" (1966)
 "If the Shoe Pinches" (1970)
 "Out of the Mouths of Babes" (1971)
 Cheers: 
 "Bar Wars III: The Return of Tecumseh" (1990)
 "Bar Wars VII: The Naked Prey" (1993)
 The Crazy Ones: "March Madness" (2014)
 The Drew Carey Show: "The Sex Drug" (1998)
 The Flying Nun: "May the Wind Be Always at Your Back" (1968)
 Grounded for Life: "It's Hard to Be a Saint in the City" (2004)
 Happy Days: "Joanie's Weird Boyfriend" (1977)
 Home Improvement: "Desperately Seeking Willow" (1998)
 How I Met Your Mother: "No Tomorrow" (2008)
 It's Always Sunny in Philadelphia: "Charlie Catches a Leprechaun" (2016)
 Letterkenny: "St. Patrick's Day Special" (2017)
 Mike & Molly: "St. Patrick's Day" (2013)
 The Office: "St. Patrick's Day" (2010)
 One Fine Day: "Veteran Status" (2008)
 Only Fools and Horses: "It's Only Rock and Roll" (1985)
 The Real O'Neals: "The Real Lent" (2016)
 Sabrina the Teenage Witch: "Salem, the Boy" (1999)
 Still Standing: "Still Parading" (2004)
Superstore: "Playdate" (2020)

Other 
 AEW Dynamite: "St. Patrick's Day Slam" (2021)

See also 
 List of films set around St. Patrick's Day
 List of Christmas television specials
 List of Halloween television specials
 List of Thanksgiving television specials
 List of Easter television specials
 List of Valentine's Day television specials

 
Lists of television episodes by holiday
Lists of television specials